Ewartia is a genus of cicadas in the family Cicadidae. There are about eight described species in Ewartia.

Species
These eight species belong to the genus Ewartia:
 Ewartia brevis (Ashton, 1912) c g
 Ewartia carina g
 Ewartia cuensis (Distant, 1913) c g
 Ewartia etesia g
 Ewartia lapidosa g
 Ewartia oldfieldi (Distant, 1883) c g
 Ewartia roberti g
 Ewartia thamna g
Data sources: i = ITIS, c = Catalogue of Life, g = GBIF, b = Bugguide.net

References

Further reading

 
 
 
 

Cicadettini
Cicadidae genera